John Harding Lucas III (born November 21, 1982) is an American professional basketball coach and former player who is currently an assistant coach for the Los Angeles Lakers of the National Basketball Association (NBA). He played college basketball for Baylor and Oklahoma State.

Early life
Born in Washington, D.C. to former NBA player and coach John Lucas II and his wife DeEdgra, Lucas lived in Wynnewood, Pennsylvania for a time as a youth. Lucas was the starting point guard on the Bellaire High School basketball team and played alongside fellow future NBA players Emeka Okafor and Lawrence Roberts. Lucas has a younger brother, Jai.

He originally played collegiately at Baylor University, but transferred from there to Oklahoma State University in the wake of the 2003 Baylor basketball scandal. Lucas is noted for his winning shot against the Saint Joseph's University team that sent the 2004 Oklahoma State Cowboys to the NCAA Final Four.

Professional career
After going undrafted in the 2005 NBA draft, Lucas joined the Minnesota Timberwolves for the 2005 NBA Summer League. The Timberwolves also signed him to their training camp roster. During the 2005–06 NBA season, Lucas was called up by the Houston Rockets from the Tulsa 66ers in December 2005. He played 13 games for the Rockets between December and February. Lucas's call-up made him the first Tulsa 66ers player to be called up from the NBA Development League. He averaged 16.6 points in 33.2 mins per game with the 66ers.

On May 10, 2006, Lucas signed with Snaidero Udine of the Italian League, to fill the gap left by Jerome Allen, who was out for the season due to injury.

On July 28, 2006, Lucas signed with the Rockets to a three-year contract. In the 2006–07 season, Lucas and the Rockets made it to the playoffs, where they lost to the Utah Jazz in the first round, in 7 games. On October 30, 2007, Lucas was one of four players cut from the Rockets' roster, prior to the commencement of the 2007–08 season.

He subsequently returned to Italian basketball, joining Benetton Treviso in January 2008. He was then later released by Treviso in March. Lucas was signed by the Oklahoma City Thunder in September 2008 but was released by them in November before playing in any NBA games for them. In February 2009, he signed with the Colorado 14ers and helped them go on to win the 2008–09 D-League championship. On April 27, 2009, Lucas signed with TAU Cerámica of the Spanish ACB League for the remainder of the season.

On September 2, 2009, Lucas was drafted by the Maine Red Claws in the NBA Development League expansion draft.

Lucas played in the 2009 NBA preseason for the Miami Heat. He played four games and averaged 7.0 points, 2.3 assists and 1.3 rebounds in 12.5 minutes per game. On October 23, 2009, Lucas was waived by the Heat.

Lucas then spent the 2009–10 season with the Shanghai Sharks of the CBA.

Lucas spent the 2010 NBA preseason with the Chicago Bulls but was waived on October 21. The Bulls re-signed him on November 26. In his debut for the Bulls, Lucas missed two critical free throws in the final seconds of a 98–97 loss to the Denver Nuggets. He was waived on January 4, 2011, and signed with the Shanghai Sharks in China. After his 2-month China stint, he returned to America and re-signed with the Bulls on March 20, 2011. On January 11, 2012, Lucas received his first-ever NBA start and achieved a career-high of 25 points, leading the Bulls in a 78–64 win over the Washington Wizards. He also played 45 minutes, made 11 of 28 field goal attempts, and had 8 assists and 8 rebounds (all career-highs).

On March 14, 2012, the Bulls hosted the Miami Heat. The Bulls were missing Derrick Rose, who was out due to a groin injury. Lucas scored 24 points and led the Chicago Bulls to a 106–102 victory over the Miami Heat.

On March 21, 2012, Lucas led the Bulls to a comeback victory over the Toronto Raptors, scoring all of his 13 points in the 4th quarter.

On July 27, 2012, Lucas signed with the Toronto Raptors.

On July 22, 2013, Lucas signed with the Utah Jazz.

On July 22, 2014, Lucas was traded, along with Erik Murphy and Malcolm Thomas, to the Cleveland Cavaliers in exchange for Carrick Felix, a 2015 second round draft pick and cash considerations. On September 25, 2014, he was traded, along with Erik Murphy, Dwight Powell, Malcolm Thomas and the Cavaliers' 2016 and 2017 second-round picks, to the Boston Celtics in exchange for Keith Bogans and two future second-round picks. Four days later, he was waived by the Celtics.

On October 21, 2014, Lucas signed with the Washington Wizards. Four days later, he was waived by the Wizards. On November 21, 2014, he signed with the Fujian Sturgeons for the rest of the 2014–15 CBA season. His final game for Fujian came on January 30, 2015, and left China having averaged 26.3 points, 7.0 assists and 4.6 rebounds over 28 games. On February 2, he signed a 10-day contract with the Detroit Pistons. On February 12, he signed a second 10-day contract with the Pistons. On February 25, he signed with the Pistons for the rest of the season.

On September 28, 2015, Lucas signed with the Miami Heat. However, he was later waived by the Heat on October 24 after appearing in one preseason game. On January 14, 2016, Lucas was acquired by the Fort Wayne Mad Ants of the NBA Development League. One day later, he made his debut in a 109–104 loss to the Sioux Falls Skyforce, recording 21 points, 6 rebounds, 6 assists and three steals in 32 minutes of action. On March 6, he was waived by the Mad Ants after averaging 17.7 points per game in 18 games. On March 17, he signed with Piratas de Quebradillas of the Puerto Rican League.

On September 26, 2016, Lucas signed with the Minnesota Timberwolves. On January 7, 2017, he was waived by the Timberwolves after appearing in five games.

NBA career statistics

Regular season

|-
| align="left" | 
| align="left" | Houston
| 13 || 0 || 8.2 || .389 || .222 || .000 || .4 || .9 || .4 || .0 || 2.3
|-
| align="left" | 
| align="left" | Houston
| 47 || 0 || 8.1 || .397 || .254 || .789 || .8 || .7 || .4 || .0 || 3.3
|-
| align="left" | 
| align="left" | Chicago
| 2 || 0 || 5.0 || .333 || .000 || .000 || .0 || .5 || .0 || .0 || 1.0
|-
| align="left" | 
| align="left" | Chicago
| 49 || 2 || 14.8 || .399 || .393 || .875 || 1.6 || 2.2 || .4 || .0 || 7.5
|-
| align="left" | 
| align="left" | Toronto
| 63 || 0 || 13.1 || .386 || .377 || .720 || 1.0 || 1.7 || .4 || .0 || 5.3
|-
| align="left" | 
| align="left" | Utah
| 42 || 6 || 14.1 || .326 || .298 || .625 || .9 || 1.0 || .3 || .0 || 3.8
|-
| align="left" | 
| align="left" | Detroit
| 21 || 0 || 13.0 || .404 || .310 || 1.000 || .8 || 2.9 || .4 || .0 || 4.7
|-
| align="left" | 
| align="left" | Minnesota
| 5 || 0 || 2.2 || .250 || .000|| .000 || .0 || 0.2 || .4 || .0 || 0.4
|- class="sortbottom"
| align="center" colspan="2"| Career
| 242 || 8 || 12.1 || .383 || .344 || .768 || 1.0 || 1.5 || .4 || .0 || 4.7

Playoffs

|-
| align="left" | 2007
| align="left" | Houston
| 2 || 0 || 4.0 || .000 || .000 || .000 || .0 || .0 || .5 || .0 || 0.0
|-
| align="left" | 2012
| align="left" | Chicago
| 5 || 0 || 18.8 || .450 || .385 || 1.000 || 1.4 || 1.8 || .0 || .0 || 8.3
|- class="sortbottom"
| align="center" colspan="2"| Career
| 7 || 0 || 14.6 || .439 || .397 || 1.000 || 1.0 || 1.3 || .1 || .0 || 6.1

Coaching career
On September 21, 2017, the Minnesota Timberwolves announced additions to their coaching staff for the 2017–18 season while Lucas was named as Player Development Coach.

On September 15, 2021, the Los Angeles Lakers announced that they had hired Lucas as assistant coach. On June 7, 2022, he was let go as new Lakers coach Darvin Ham formed his staff.

References

External links

1982 births
Living people
21st-century African-American sportspeople
African-American basketball players
All-American college men's basketball players
American expatriate basketball people in Canada
American expatriate basketball people in China
American expatriate basketball people in Italy
American expatriate basketball people in Spain
American men's basketball players
Basketball players from Pennsylvania
Basketball players from Houston
Basketball players from Washington, D.C.
Baylor Bears men's basketball players
Bellaire High School (Bellaire, Texas) alumni
Chicago Bulls players
Colorado 14ers players
Detroit Pistons players
Fort Wayne Mad Ants players
Fujian Sturgeons players
Houston Rockets players
Liga ACB players
Los Angeles Lakers assistant coaches
Minnesota Timberwolves assistant coaches
Minnesota Timberwolves players
Oklahoma State Cowboys basketball players
Pallacanestro Treviso players
Pallalcesto Amatori Udine players
People from Lower Merion Township, Pennsylvania
Piratas de Quebradillas players
Point guards
Saski Baskonia players
Shanghai Sharks players
Sportspeople from Montgomery County, Pennsylvania
Toronto Raptors players
Tulsa 66ers players
Undrafted National Basketball Association players
Utah Jazz players
20th-century African-American people